Gongora bufonia is a species of orchid found in southeastern Brazil.

References

bufonia
Orchids of Brazil